Mount Selvili is the highest peak of the unrecognised Turkish Republic of Northern Cyprus at an altitude of 1,024 metres (3,360 ft), situated in the Kyrenia Mountains. It is located in the Kyrenia District.

References

External links

 Peakery page on Mount Selvili

Mountains of Northern Cyprus
Mountains of Cyprus
Kyrenia Mountains
One-thousanders of Northern Cyprus
One-thousanders of Cyprus
Highest points of countries